"Strong in the Sun" is a song by Irish band Tír na nÓg written by Leo O'Kelly. It was released on September 7, 1973 by Chrysalis Records as a single, with "The Mountain and I" as its B-side. It was later released on the studio album of the same name.

Format and track listing
UK 7" single (CHS 2016)
"Strong in the Sun" (Leo O'Kelly)
"The Mountain and I" (Sonny Condell)

Personnel
Sonny Condell - vocals, guitar
Leo O'Kelly - vocals, guitar

1973 singles
Tír na nÓg (band) songs